FC Saint-Léonard was a Canadian semi-professional soccer club based in Saint-Leonard, Quebec that played two seasons in the Première Ligue de soccer du Québec.

History
The club was originally formed in 1978. Prior to joining the PLSQ, the club played in the Ligue de Soccer Elite Quebec, which is the top amateur division in Quebec.

In 2012, the semi-professional club was established to play in the newly formed Première Ligue de soccer du Québec, a Division III league, as one of the founding members. They won the inaugural PLSQ championship, coming in first place out of the five teams. In 2013, they played an exhibition match against the Haiti national football team. The club did not return for the 2014 PLSQ season, due to the high financial costs associated with operating a team.

Seasons

Notable former players
The following players have either played at the professional or international level, either before or after playing for the PLSQ team:

Honours
PLSQ Championship (1): 2012

References

Association football clubs established in 1978
Soccer clubs in Montreal
Saint-Leonard, Quebec
St-Léonard
1978 establishments in Quebec